Germán Saúl Sánchez Sánchez (born 24 June 1992) is a Mexican diver. He is nicknamed "Duva". At the age of 16, he competed in the Men's individual 10m platform at the 2008 Summer Olympics and came in 22nd. He won one gold medal in the 2011 Pan-American Games. At the 2012 Summer Olympics in London, he won a silver medal in the synchronized 10m platform with his partner Iván García. In the individual 10m platform, Sánchez came 14th. In 2016, Sánchez took part in his third Olympic Games in Rio de Janeiro, Brazil, where he came 5th in the synchronized 10m platform, again alongside Iván García. Twelve days later, Sánchez won the silver medal in individual 10m platform. and 9th in the semi-final. He became the third Mexican athlete to win an Olympic silver medal in Men's individual 10m platform after Joaquín Capilla (1952) and Álvaro Gaxiola (1968). He is also the only Mexican diver who has won Olympic medals in both individual and synchronized events.

Technical features 
Sánchez is a talented diver who has mastered a series of the most difficult dives since 2012. The dives which he uses now in the competition and their degrees of difficulty are: Forward 4½ Somersaults-Tuck 109C (3.7), Back 3½ Somersaults-Tuck 207C (3.3), Reverse 3½ Somersaults-Tuck 307C (3.4), Inward 4½ Somersaults-Tuck 409C (4.1), Forward 2½ Somersaults 3 Twists-Pike 5156B (3.8) and Armstand Back 3 Somersaults-Tuck 626C (3.3). The total degree of difficulty of his dives is 21.6, which is the world's third greatest following Iván García(MEX) and Yang Jian(CHN). Of his dives, 409C is the most difficult. However, due to the high level of difficulty, he cannot perform the dives perfectly all the time. It is common for him to perform unsteadily.

Olympic experiences 
Sánchez took part in his first Olympic Games at the 2008 Beijing Olympic Games at the age of 16. He only participated in the individual 10m platform. The six dives he performed were respectively 5253B, 207C, 307C, 6142D, 407C, and 109C. The total degree of difficulty was only 19.9, which was not enough to be competitive. As a result, he was eliminated after the qualifying round with a score of 399.35 and a final ranking of 22nd.

Sánchez qualified to participate in both the individual and synchronized 10m platform at the 2012 Summer Olympics with his performance at the 2012 FINA Diving World Cup where he achieved the silver medal alongside Iván García. This time, the dives he performed were much more competitive than those of 2008 Beijing Olympic Games. The six dives they performed in the synchronized 10m platform were 401B, 201B, 109C, 409C, 307C, 5156B. They performed all of their dives almost perfectly, coming in second with a score of 468.90, 17.88 points behind Chinese divers Cao Yuan and Zhang Yanquan.

In the individual event, the six dives Sánchez performed were 207C, 5156B, 626C, 409C, 307C, 109C. The total degree of difficulty was 21.5, however due to a poor performance in the dive 626C, he was eliminated after the semi-final, ranked 14th.   
    

At the age of 24, Sánchez participated in his third Olympic Games - 2016 Summer Olympics. He was qualified to participate in both individual and synchronized 10m platform with Iván García. In the synchronized 10m platform, their dives were different from those at 2012 Summer Olympics. Their six dives were 401B, 301B, 5255B, 109C, 207C, and 5156B.  Without 409C, their total difficult degrees were 18.4, which was still the highest in that competition. They ended up in 5th place, after Chen Aisen/Lin Yue (CHN), David Boudia/Steele Johnson (USA), Thomas Daley/Daniel Goodfellow (GBR), and Patrick Hausding/Sascha Klein (GER).

Twelve days later, Sánchez dived in the final of the individual 10m platform, after ranking only 12th in the preliminary and 9th in the semi-final. Due to injury, he adjusted his dives and the overall degree of difficulty was reduced to 20.7. In contrast to his sub-par performances in the preliminary and semi-final rounds, he performed every dive steadily and won the silver medal with a high score of 532.70.

Competitive history
Sánchez became a professional diver at the 2008 Summer Olympics in Beijing. From then on, he has been representing Mexico FINA World Junior Diving Championships, FINA World Aquatics Championships, Olympic Games, FINA Diving World Cup, FINA Diving World Series, Pan American Games and Central American and Caribbean Games. He has won many medals from these competitions since 2010. He has won one gold medal in the Pan American Games in 2011, as well as Olympic silver medals in London 2012 (synchronized) and Rio 2016 (individual).

@with Iván García
#with Alejandra Orozco

*with Alejandro Islas Arroyo
§Veracruz, MEX held two legs of 2010 FINA Diving World Series.
† Guadalajara, MEX held two legs of 2013 FINA Diving World Series.
% With different pairs.

References

1992 births
Mexican male divers
Sportspeople from Guadalajara, Jalisco
Divers at the 2008 Summer Olympics
Divers at the 2012 Summer Olympics
Divers at the 2016 Summer Olympics
Olympic divers of Mexico
Medalists at the 2012 Summer Olympics
Medalists at the 2016 Summer Olympics
Olympic medalists in diving
Olympic silver medalists for Mexico
Divers at the 2011 Pan American Games
Pan American Games gold medalists for Mexico
Living people
World Aquatics Championships medalists in diving
Pan American Games medalists in diving
Universiade medalists in diving
Central American and Caribbean Games gold medalists for Mexico
Competitors at the 2010 Central American and Caribbean Games
Universiade bronze medalists for Mexico
Central American and Caribbean Games medalists in diving
Medalists at the 2013 Summer Universiade
Medalists at the 2011 Pan American Games
21st-century Mexican people